"Brachyglene" superbior is a moth of the family Notodontidae first described by Embrik Strand in 1912. It is found in Ecuador.

Taxonomy
The species does not belong in Brachyglene and has even been identified as an Arctiidae species, but has not been placed in another genus yet.

References

Moths described in 1912
Notodontidae of South America